Frank McBrearty Jnr is an Irish politician and businessman, who has been a County Councillor on Donegal County Council since 2009. The son of Frank McBrearty Snr, McBrearty became known nationally as a result of the Morris Tribunal's ruling that police had tried to frame him for the 1996 murder of Richie Barron. McBrearty pursued the Irish state in a long-running legal battle to restore his good name. In 2005, he settled all his claims against the Irish state.

McBrearty was in court in 2012, when a landmark judgement found in favour of him and his wife against Allied Irish Banks (AIB).

Politics
McBrearty ran in the 2009 local elections for the Labour Party. He stood in the Stranorlar local electoral area, and was elected to Donegal County Council. He was re-elected for the same area as an Independent in 2014. In late May 2019 he was again elected, this time for the Lifford-Stanorlar local electoral area, and for the Fine Gael party, having joined that party two months earlier. But by the start of June he had resigned from the party and said he intended to sue it for post-traumatic stress disorder, after claiming that he was "the victim of internal party bullying". He also threatened to "make the council unworkable" if he was "excluded from power-sharing".
McBrearty has been accused of act(ing) like (a) thug... at a council meeting in Buncrana in which he allegedly and forcibly removed or stole a mobile device from another elected official.  Gardai are investigating the incident, which McBrearty denies despite several witnesses.  McBrearty has made reference to a phone being in the middle of the Atlantic.

References

Year of birth missing (living people)
Living people
Drinking establishment owners
Irish businesspeople
Independent politicians in Ireland
Labour Party (Ireland) politicians
Local councillors in County Donegal
Mayors of places in the Republic of Ireland
People from Raphoe